Natasha Maria Hamilton (born 17 July 1982) is an English singer and a member of girl group Atomic Kitten. Hamilton has so far released 19 singles and three studio albums with the band including three number one singles, their biggest being the 2001 single "Whole Again". In 2004, Atomic Kitten announced they would be splitting to pursue solo careers; they reformed in 2005 and again in 2008. In March 2012, Hamilton confirmed the trio would reform officially for the first time since 2004 to tour.

Early life 
Hamilton was born in Kensington, Liverpool, and started singing and performing from the age of 12 in the Starlight Show Group. Her father is mixed race, he is of white and black ancestry.

Hamilton attended St. Sebastian's Catholic Primary School and then Broughton Hall Technology College, both situated in her home city of Liverpool.

Career

Atomic Kitten 

In May 1999, Hamilton joined Atomic Kitten, a girl group founded by OMD frontman Andy McCluskey, replacing Heidi Range who left the early line up.

Hamilton decided to take her baby with her on the 2003 tour with Atomic Kitten. However, the group decided to take a lengthy break following the tour. Although they have not made a new album together since 2003, the group reform occasionally for one-off performances.

In 2003, Hamilton was winner of the annual Rear of the Year award.

After taking time away from music to bring up her son, Hamilton made a return to music after appearing on the BBC1 television show, Just the Two of Us, which paired celebrities with recording artists to compete in a duet singing showdown. Eight couples competed before a panel of judges and the voting public. Hamilton was paired with Mark Moraghan, famous for his portrayal of Doctor Owen Davies in Holby City, and the pair came second. They performed classic songs like "Over the Rainbow" and "Do You Love Me".

On 4 March 2012, it was announced that Atomic Kitten would reform.

Solo career 
Hamilton has reportedly been working on solo material in recent years, though nothing has been released as yet. She has been co-writing with Christopher and Anthony Griffiths, Ciaron Bell, among others. Hamilton, under the name "Tash", has also recorded a track with Mischa Daniels called "Round & Round", which samples Crystal Waters' "Gypsy Woman (She's Homeless)". The track has been included on the Ministry of Sound compilation Housexy: The Afterparty.

On 8 May 2009, in an interview given to the Daily Mirror, Hamilton stated that her first solo single was likely to be "Ms. Emotional", a ballad she recorded in the United States the previous year. In the interview she stated that the album would be released 'around' October 2009. In November 2009, Hamilton appeared on Celebrity Come Dine with Me. Natasha shot the video for 'Ms Emotional' on 30 January 2010 put the release on hold to focus on her third pregnancy. The single and video then were released in October 2010.

In 2001, she appeared on Lily Savage's Blankety Blank. Hamilton made her pantomime debut when she played the title role in Peter Pan at the Liverpool Empire. It ran from 7 December 2009 until 3 January 2010.

She took over the role of Ms Johnstone in the West End production of Blood Brothers.
She appeared as the title character in 'Cinderella' in Southport theatre throughout December 2012.

On 27 August 2015, Hamilton entered the Celebrity Big Brother house as a contestant. On 24 September, she reached the final on Day 29 and placed third. she joined The real housewives of Cheshire in 2023

Personal life 

Hamilton announced in April 2002 that she was pregnant by her then-boyfriend Fran Cosgrave, nightclub owner and former bodyguard of Westlife, but she had no intention of leaving Atomic Kitten and wanted the scheduled 2002 tour to continue. She was featured in the video "The Tide Is High (Get the Feeling)" with her last duty being the 2002 Party in the Park before finally going on maternity leave. On 24 August 2002 she gave birth to a boy, Josh. However, Hamilton and Cosgrave ended their relationship shortly afterwards.

On 31 December 2004, Hamilton gave birth to her second son, Harry Hatcher, whose father is dancer Gavin Hatcher. In July 2005, Hamilton and Hatcher split up and she briefly returned to live with Cosgrave, while Hatcher returned to Ipswich to work in the insurance industry. By February 2006, Hamilton and Cosgrave had split for a second time.

On 27 September 2006, Hamilton announced her engagement to Riad Erraji. The couple married on 23 November 2007 at Crewe Hall Hotel with both Jenny Frost and Liz McClarnon present. Hamilton has since said that Kerry Katona was not invited to the wedding as the two of them have drifted too far apart. In January 2008, Hamilton found out she was expecting her third child, but she miscarried after six weeks.

On 14 June 2010, Natasha gave birth to her third son. In July 2013, Hamilton announced her separation from her husband Riad Erraji.

Since 2013, Hamilton had been dating Ritchie Neville from Five. The pair both took part in ITV2's The Big Reunion the same year. They have both stated that they had also previously dated in the past but chose to go their separate ways due to the scheduling from both of their groups. Hamilton gave birth to a baby girl, Ella Rose, in September 2014. In March 2016, Hamilton and Neville announced they had split.

Nine months later, on 28 November, Hamilton announced her engagement to boyfriend Charles Gay. On 25 September 2021, the couple married in Lake Como, Italy. In February 2023, Hamilton announced that she is expecting her fifth child with Gay.

Discography

Singles 
As main artist

As featured artist

References

External links 

1982 births
Atomic Kitten members
English people of Scottish descent
English people of African descent
Living people
Musicians from Liverpool
English women pop singers
21st-century English women singers
21st-century English singers